Dabardan may refer to:
 Dabardan-e Olya
 Dabardan-e Sofla